Skippy Hamahona (born Marama Cecelia McGregor on 1 January 1975) is a former field hockey player from New Zealand. She finished in sixth position with the Women's National Team, nicknamed Black Sticks, at the 2000 Summer Olympics in Sydney, Australia. Two years earlier she was a member of the side that claimed the bronze medal at the 1998 Commonwealth Games in Kuala Lumpur, Malaysia. She was born in Sydney, Australia.

External links

 New Zealand Olympic Committee
 

1975 births
Living people
New Zealand female field hockey players
Olympic field hockey players of New Zealand
Commonwealth Games bronze medallists for New Zealand
Commonwealth Games medallists in field hockey
Field hockey players at the 1998 Commonwealth Games
Field hockey players at the 2000 Summer Olympics
Sportswomen from New South Wales
Sportspeople from Sydney
Medallists at the 1998 Commonwealth Games